The 1885 Princeton Tigers football team represented the College of New Jersey, then more commonly known as Princeton College, in the 1885 college football season. The team finished with a 9–0 record and was retroactively named as national champions by the Billingsley Report, Helms Athletic Foundation, Houlgate System, National Championship Foundation, and Parke H. Davis. This season marked Princeton's 13th football national championship.

The season was notable for one of the most celebrated football plays of the 19th century—a 90-yard punt return by Henry "Tillie" Lamar in the closing minutes of the game to beat Yale, 6–5, a team Princeton had not defeated since 1878.

Schedule

References

Princeton
Princeton Tigers football seasons
College football national champions
College football undefeated seasons
Princeton Tigers football